The following highways are numbered 850:

Canada
  Alberta Highway 850

United States 
  SR 850 in Florida
  LA 850 in Louisiana
  SR 850 in Ohio
  PA 850 in Pennsylvania
  PR-850 in Puerto Rico
  SC 850 in South Carolina (former)